is a railway station in Tokyo's Chiyoda ward. It is at the center of the Akihabara shopping district specializing in electronic goods.

Lines
Akihabara Station is served by the following lines.
JR East:
 Tōhoku Main Line
  Keihin-Tohoku Line
  Yamanote Line
 Sōbu Main Line
  Chūō-Sōbu Line

Tokyo Metro:
  

Metropolitan Intercity Railway Company:
Tsukuba Express

The above-ground section of the station is cross-shaped, with the Chūō-Sōbu Line tracks running from east to west, and the Yamanote and Keihin-Tohoku Line (and Tohoku Shinkansen and Ueno–Tokyo Line, which do not stop at Akihabara) from north to south.

Station layout

JR East

There are two island platforms serving four tracks for the Yamanote Line and the Keihin-Tohoku Line on the 2nd level, and two side platforms serving two tracks for the Sobu Line Local service on the 4th level.

Chest-high platform edge doors were installed on the Yamanote Line platforms in May 2015, to be brought into operation from 20 June 2015.

Tokyo Metro

There are two underground side platforms serving two tracks.

The song "Koi Suru Fortune Cookie" by AKB48 is to be used as the departure melody on the Hibiya Line platforms from spring 2016.

Tsukuba Express

There is an underground island platform serving two tracks.

History
Akihabara Station was opened in November 1890 as a freight terminal linked to Ueno Station via tracks following the course of the modern day Yamanote Line.

It was opened to passenger traffic in 1925 following the construction of the section of track linking Ueno with Shimbashi via Tokyo Station and the completion of the Yamanote Line. The upper level platforms were added in 1932 with the opening of an extension to the Sōbu Line from its old terminal at Ryōgoku to Ochanomizu, making Akihabara an important transfer station for passengers from the east of Tokyo and Chiba Prefecture.

The huge growth in commuter traffic following the Second World War caused considerable congestion and was only relieved with the construction of the Sōbu line tunnel linking Kinshichō with Tokyo, bypassing Akihabara.

The Hibiya Line subway station was opened on May 31, 1962, with the line's extension from Naka-Okachimachi to Ningyōchō.

The station facilities of the Hibiya Line were inherited by Tokyo Metro after the privatization of the Teito Rapid Transit Authority (TRTA) in 2004.

On August 24, 2005, the underground terminus of the new Tsukuba Express Line opened at Akihabara. The entire station complex, including the JR station, was also refurbished and enlarged in preparation for the opening of the Tsukuba Express.

Station numbering was introduced in 2016 with Akihabara being assigned station numbers JY03 for the Yamanote line, JK28 for the Keihin-Tōhoku line, and JB19 for the Chūō-Sōbu line. At the same time, JR East assigned a three-letter code to their major interchange stations; Akihabara was assigned the three-letter code "AKB".

Passenger statistics

In fiscal 2013, the JR East station was used by an average of 240,327 passengers daily (boarding passengers only), making it the ninth-busiest station operated by JR East. Over the same fiscal year, the Tokyo Metro station was used by an average of 122,576 passengers daily (both exiting and entering passengers), making it the 23rd busiest Tokyo Metro station. The passenger figures for previous years are as shown below. Note that JR East figures are for boarding passengers only.

Surrounding area
The main attraction is the Akihabara electronics retail district to the north and west of the station.

 Iwamotocho Station ( Toei Shinjuku Line)
 Suehirocho Station ( Tokyo Metro Ginza Line)

Bus terminal

Route buses 
 Cha 51(茶51); For Ochanomizu Station, Hongō-sanchōme Station, and Komagome Station
 Aki 26(秋26); For Kanda Station, Iwamotochō Station, Kiyosumi-shirakawa Station, and Kasai Station
 Kazaguruma Akihabara Route; For Ochanomizu Station, Chiyoda City Office
 Kazaguruma Akihabara Route; For Ochanomizu Station, Chiyoda City Office

Highway buses 
 My Town Direct Bus; For Tokyo Disney Resort, Shin-Urayasu Area
 Airport Limousine; For Haneda Airport
 Kanto Yakimono Liner; For Kasama Station, Mashiko Station
 For Takasaki Station, Shin-Maebashi Station, Maebashi Station, and Maebashi Bus Center
 Tono Kamaishi; For Shin-Hanamaki Station, Tōno Station, Kamaishi Station, Kirikiri, and Yamada
 Yuhi; For Tsuruoka Station, Amarume Station, and Sakata Station
 Southern Cross; For Kyōto Station, Ōsaka Station, Namba Station, and Osaka City Air Terminal (JR Namba Station)
 Tokyo Tokkyu New Star; For Kyōto Station, Ōsaka Station, Universal Studios Japan, Tennōji Station, Ōsaka Uehommachi Station, and Fuse Station
 For Toyama Station, Kanazawa Station, and Kenroku-en

See also

 List of railway stations in Japan

References

External links

 Akihabara Station information (JR East) 
 Akihabara Station information (Tokyo Metro) 
 Akihabara Station information (Tsukuba Express) 

Stations of East Japan Railway Company
Yamanote Line
Keihin-Tōhoku Line
Chūō-Sōbu Line
Sōbu Main Line
Tokyo Metro Hibiya Line
Stations of Tokyo Metro
Stations of Tsukuba Express
Railway stations in Tokyo
Railway stations in Japan opened in 2005